The Men's 4 × 200 m Freestyle Relay at the 10th FINA World Swimming Championships (25m) was swum on 16 December 2010 in Dubai, United Arab Emirates. 16 nations swam in the Preliminary heats in the morning, from which the top-8 finishers advanced to the Final that evening.

At the start of the event, the existing World (WR) and Championship records (CR) were:

The following records were established during the competition:

Results

Heats

Final

References

Freestyle relay 4x200 metre, Men's
World Short Course Swimming Championships